Ramin Takloo-Bighash (born 1974) is a mathematician who works in the field of automorphic forms and Diophantine geometry and is a professor at the University of Illinois at Chicago.

Mathematical career
Takloo-Bighash graduated from the Sharif University of Technology, where he enrolled after winning a Silver medal at the 1992 International Mathematical Olympiad. In 2001, Takloo-Bighash graduated under Joseph Shalika from Johns Hopkins University. He spent 2001-2007 at Princeton University, first as an instructor and then as an assistant professor. He is a professor at the University of Illinois at Chicago.

Research
Takloo-Bighash computed the local factors of spinor L-function attached to generic automorphic forms on the symplectic group GSp(4). He has joint works with Joseph Shalika and Yuri Tschinkel on the distribution of rational points on certain group compactifications. He is a co-author, with Steven J. Miller, of An Invitation To Modern Number Theory (Princeton University Press, 2006).

Books

External links
 Takloo-Bighash's web page at UIC

1974 births
Living people
21st-century Iranian mathematicians
Iranian Mathematics Competition Medalists
Number theorists
Johns Hopkins University alumni